Nasehabad may refer to:
 Nasehabad, Hamadan
 Nasehabad, Kerman